Gerald Smith may refer to:

Gerald L. K. Smith (1898–1976), American activist and politician
Gerald W. Smith (1929–2017), American writer
Gerald Smith (Canadian politician) (born 1943), Canadian politician
Gerald Martin Smith (born 1955), British businessman and convicted fraudster
Gerald Oliver Smith (1892–1974), English-born actor in the United States
Gerald Birney Smith (1868-1929), American author
Gerald Steadman Smith (1929–2015), Canadian artist
Gerry Smith (born 1939), English footballer

See also
Gerald Smyth (1885–1920), British Army officer
Jerry Smith (disambiguation)
Gerard Smith (disambiguation)